Hendrik Swellengrebel (Cape Town, 20 September 1700 – Utrecht, 26 December 1760) was the first and only Dutch East India Company governor of the Dutch Cape Colony who was born in the Cape.

Life
Swellengrebel was governor from 14 April 1739 to 27 February 1751. In his time, new districts were added to the colony. The town of Swellendam in the Western Cape is named after him and his wife Helena Wilhelmina ten Damme.

In 1751 he was succeeded as governor by Ryk Tulbagh. Upon return to the Netherlands, he bought the land now known as the Kaapse Bossen (Cape Forests) in Utrecht.

References

1700 births
1760 deaths
18th-century Dutch people
18th-century South African people
18th-century Dutch colonial governors
Governors of the Dutch Cape Colony
Politicians from Cape Town